Florida's 6th House District elects one member of the Florida House of Representatives. The district is represented by Jay Trumbull. This district is located in the Florida Panhandle, and encompasses part of the Emerald Coast. The district covers the southern half of Bay County. This district is anchored on Panama City, its largest city. As of the 2010 Census, the district's population is 159,266.

This district contains Tyndall Air Force Base and Northwest Florida Beaches International Airport. The district also contains Gulf Coast State College and Florida State University Panama City, both located in Panama City.

Allen Bense served as the Speaker of the Florida House of Representatives from 2004 until 2006.

Representatives from 1967 to the present

See also 

 Florida's 2nd Senate district
 Florida's 2nd congressional district

References 

06
Panama City, Florida
Bay County, Florida